Karsten Selby Heckl is a United States Marine Corps lieutenant general who serves as the deputy commandant for combat development and integration and commanding general of the Marine Corps Combat Development Command. Heckl most recently served as the Commander of the I Marine Expeditionary Force. He previously served as commander of the 2nd Marine Aircraft Wing.

References

https://en.wikipedia.org/wiki/Roy_Kitchener

Year of birth missing (living people)
Living people
Place of birth missing (living people)
Georgia State University alumni
United States Naval Aviators
United States Marine Corps personnel of the Iraq War
United States Marine Corps personnel of the War in Afghanistan (2001–2021)
Recipients of the Air Medal
Recipients of the Meritorious Service Medal (United States)
Recipients of the Legion of Merit
United States Marine Corps generals
Recipients of the Defense Superior Service Medal